PDSA may refer to:
 PDSA (plan–do–study–act), a quality improvement process
 People's Dispensary for Sick Animals, a UK veterinary charity
 Protostadienol synthase, an enzyme